Men’s doubles badminton event at the 1996 Summer Olympics was held from 25 July to 1 August 1996. The tournament was single-elimination. Matches consisted of three sets, with sets being to 15 for men's doubles. The tournament was held at the Georgia State University Gymnasium.

Seeds
  (gold medalists)
  (silver medalists)
  (second round)
  (bronze medalists)

Results

Finals

Top Half

Bottom Half

References

Sources
Badminton at the 1996 Atlanta Summer Games: Men's Doubles

Badminton at the 1996 Summer Olympics
Men's events at the 1996 Summer Olympics